Bedford Row is a shopping street in Limerick, Ireland. The street is named after John Russell, 4th Duke of Bedford who was Lord Lieutenant of Ireland from 1757 to 1761. The street starts at a junction with O'Connell Street and continues westwards forming a junction with Henry Street and continues between Dunnes Stores and the Augustinian Church and ends at Howley's Quay.

Bedford Row has seen extensive investment and redevelopment in the past few years. The street has been pedestrianised between O'Connell Street and Henry Street and the south facing end of the street has been completely redeveloped into a new modern shopping street.

The street was also the location of the 1,000 seater Savoy Theatre until 1989, when it was demolished to make way for a new cinema complex. This has since been demolished and transformed into the 5 star Savoy Hotel. A Methodist Church was once on Bedford Row but is now closed. The front facade is retained in The Gallery and The Edinburgh Woolen Mills.

Shops trading on Bedford Row
 Bank of Ireland
 Supermacs
 Diesel
 The Sale Shop
 Noel's Menswear
 City Central Shoes
 Schuh

References

Shopping districts and streets in Ireland
Streets in Limerick (city)